The Silesian Museum of Fine Arts in Breslau (German: Schlesisches Museum für bildende Künste in Breslau) was an art museum located on Museum Square in Breslau, Prussia. The museum was operating from 1880 to 1945, when it burned down after the bombing.

History 
The beginning of the museum was the collection of paintings of the Breslau Royal Museum of Art and Antiquity (Königlichen Museums für Kunst und Altertümer), which from 1815 was located in the former Augustinian monastery on Wyspa Piasek (later one of the buildings of the University Library).

In the middle of the 19th century, plans were made to build a new museum, designed by the Berlin architect Otto Rathey. In 1869, a museum building committee was established. The sgraffito decorations were made by Otto Lessing and the paintings by Hermann Prell. In 1880, the grand opening of the new museum took place in the presence of Emperor Wilhelm I. The building was to resemble an ancient Greek temple; in front of the main entrance there was a portico with ten Ionic columns. Inside there were 14 exhibition halls. On October 26, 1901, an equestrian statue of Emperor Frederick III was unveiled in front of the main entrance. The collection initially consisted mainly of works of sacred art and German paintings (among others by Andreas Achenbach, Lucas Cranach the Elder and A. von Menzel) and Western European paintings (e.g. Sandro Botticelli) as well as copies of ancient sculptures. Since 1911 also works by Picasso and Van Gogh.

Just before the end of World War II, the exhibits were hidden for fear of destruction in 80 different places in Silesia. The library collection was placed in the Herder Institute in Marburg. During the siege of Festung Breslau, the museum building was bombed and burned. After the war, the museum was moved to the former building of the Silesian Regency. The ruins were completely demolished in 1964, and in 1969 the School and Kindergarten Complex no. 13 was built on the site. The streets where the museum stood are called "Muzealna Street" and "Muzealna Square".

Most of the museum's collection was destroyed by warfare and looting; a small part has been preserved in the National Museum in Wrocław. The most valuable exhibits from the Wroclaw collection were transferred in 1946 to the National Museum in Warsaw, including Sandro Botticelli's painting Madonna with Child, John the Baptist and an Angel, Lucas Cranach the Elder's painting Adam and Eve, St. Luke Painting an Image of Mary, Pietà from Lubiaz, Polyptych of Annunciation with Unicorn, Gentile Bellini's Portrait of Lorenzo Giustiniani, and Beautiful Madonna of Wroclaw.

Gallery

Religious art

German and European art

Notes and references

Literature
 Berg: Schlesisches Museum der Bildenden Künste. In: Amtliche Berichte aus den Königlichen Kunstsammlungen Band 2, Nr. 2, 1881, S. 13–15.
 Erich Wiese, Heinz Braune: Schlesisches Museum der Bildenden Künste Breslau. Katalog der Gemälde und Skulpturen. Breslau 1929.
 Zofia Bandurska: Archivalien der ehemaligen Breslauer Kunstmuseen. In: Berichte und Forschungen. Jahrbuch des Bundesinstituts für Kultur und Geschichte der Deutschen im östlichen Europa Band 12, 2004, S. 73–79.
 Diana Codogni-Łańcucka: Das Schlesische Museum der bildenden Künste in Breslau in der NS-Zeit. In: Tanja Baensch, Kristina Kratz-Kessemeier, Dorothee Wimmer (Hrsg.): Museen im Nationalsozialismus. Akteure – Orte – Politik, Böhlau, Köln u. a. 2016, S. 245–262.

Art museums and galleries in Germany
Defunct art museums and galleries
History of Wrocław
Museums established in 1880
Fine Arts
Museums disestablished in 1945
Buildings and structures destroyed during World War II